Miklusėnai is a village in Alytus district municipality, in Alytus County, in south Lithuania. According to the 2001 census, the village has a population of 1021 people. Village name first time mentioned in 1744.

History 
In historical sources Miklusėnai village is first mentioned in 1744.

References

Alytus District Municipality
Villages in Alytus County